Silame is a Local Government Area in Sokoto State, Nigeria. Its headquarters is in the town of Silame, on the Sokoto River.

It has an area of 790 km and a population of 104,378 at the 2006 census.

The postal code of the area is 853.

References

Local Government Areas in Sokoto State